Pierre Lemonnier may refer to:

 Pierre Lemonnier (physicist) (1675–1757), French physicist and astronomer
 Pierre Lemonnier (footballer) (born 1993), French footballer